Kagoma is a district of Jema'a Local Government Area, southern Kaduna state in the Middle Belt region of Nigeria. The postal code for the village is 801104.

People

Language

Transportation

The major means of transportation in and around the town is road transportation.

References

External links

Populated places in Kaduna State